Winter Vacation is a Chinese film directed by Hongqi Li. It won the Golden Leopard at the 2010 Locarno International Film Festival.

References

External links

2010 films
Chinese drama films
Films about vacationing
Golden Leopard winners